Mangudi is a village in the Kumbakonam taluk of Thanjavur district, Tamil Nadu, India.

Demographics 

As per the 2001 census, Mangudi had a total population of 1946 with 965 males and 981 females. The sex ratio was 1017. The literacy rate was 75.12

References 

 

Villages in Thanjavur district